Intermetallic particles form during solidification of metallic alloys.

Aluminium alloys

Al-Si-Cu-Mg alloys 

For example, Al-Si-Cu-Mg alloys form Al5FeSi- plate like intermetallic phase, Chinese script like -Al8Fe2Si, Al2Cu, etc. The size and morphology of these intermetallic phases in these alloys control the mechanical properties of these alloys especially strength and ductility. The size of these phases depends on the secondary dendrite arm spacing, as well as the Si content of the alloy, of the primary phase in the micro structure.

Phases and crystal structures

Magnesium alloys

WE 43 
In-situ synchrotron diffraction experiment on Electron alloy-WE 43 (Mg4Y3Nd) shows that this alloy form the following intermetallic phases ;Mg12Nd, Mg14Y4Nd, and Mg24Y5.

Phases and crystal structures

AZ 91

References